The Road to Woodstock is a 2009 book by Michael Lang and Holly George-Warren describing Lang's involvement in creation of the Woodstock Music & Arts Festival.

References 

2009 non-fiction books
Books about rock music
Woodstock Festival